Luka Tošić (born March 10, 1988) is a Slovenian ice hockey player who is currently playing for HDD Jesenice of the Alps Hockey League.

Tošić competed in the 2013 IIHF World Championship as a member of the Slovenia men's national ice hockey team.

References

External links

1988 births
Living people
Slovenian ice hockey defencemen
Sportspeople from Jesenice, Jesenice
HDD Jesenice players
Ours de Villard-de-Lans players
HC Alleghe players
Diables Rouges de Briançon players
HK Acroni Jesenice players
HKMK Bled players
Slovenian expatriate sportspeople in France
Slovenian expatriate sportspeople in Italy
Expatriate ice hockey players in France
Expatriate ice hockey players in Italy
Slovenian expatriate ice hockey people